Mirta Francisca de la Caridad Díaz-Balart y Gutiérrez (born 30 September 1928) was the first wife of Fidel Castro. They married in 1948, had one son together, and divorced in 1955.

Biography
She was the daughter of América Gutiérrez and Rafael José Díaz-Balart, a prominent Cuban politician and mayor of the town of Banes, Cuba. She was a philosophy student at the University of Havana, when she met and married Fidel.

Castro and Diaz-Balart married on 11 October 1948, honeymooned in New York City, and divorced seven years later in 1955 (while Castro was in prison following a failed attack on the Moncada Barracks). They had one child, a son, Fidel Ángel "Fidelito" Castro Díaz-Balart (1949–2018). After the divorce, Castro was not granted custody of their son. Instead, Fidel Jr. was estranged from his father until he stayed with him after a visit in Mexico, prior to his father's return to lead the Cuban Revolution.

In 1956, Díaz-Balart married Emilio Núñez Blanco (1925–2006), the son of a former Cuban Ambassador to the UN, Emilio Núñez Portuondo. The couple lived with her children at Havana's Tarará beach resort.

Díaz-Balart lived in Madrid, Spain with her family after 1959, the year in which Castro's revolution succeeded. She was deprived of the company of her son for many years as he studied in Cuba and the Soviet Union.  The Miami Herald claimed in 2000 that she was still living in Spain, and that occasional visits to Cuba were arranged by Raúl Castro, her former brother-in-law. By 2018, the year in which her son Fidelito committed suicide, she was reportedly once again living in Cuba at age 90.

Díaz-Balart is the aunt of anti-Castro Republican Party U.S. Representative Mario Díaz-Balart and his brother, former U.S. Congressman Lincoln Díaz-Balart, and TV anchor José Díaz-Balart. She is the sister of the painter Waldo Díaz-Balart and Rafael Díaz-Balart.

References

 

Living people
Fidel Castro family
Mirta
Cuban women
1928 births
Cuban expatriates in Spain